A Bluish Bag is an album by jazz saxophonist Stanley Turrentine consisting of two sessions recorded for the Blue Note label in 1967 and arranged by Duke Pearson, the first featuring Donald Byrd and the second McCoy Tyner, among others.

Reception 

The Allmusic review by Steve Leggett awarded the album 3½ stars and states:

Track listing

Personnel 
Tracks 1-7
 Stanley Turrentine – tenor saxophone
 Donald Byrd – trumpet
 Julian Priester – trombone
 Jerry Dodgion – alto saxophone, flute, alto flute
 Joe Farrell – tenor saxophone, flute
 Pepper Adams – baritone saxophone, clarinet
 Kenny Barron – piano
 Bucky Pizzarelli – guitar
 Ron Carter – bass
 Mickey Roker – drums
 Duke Pearson – arranger

Tracks 8-12
 Stanley Turrentine – tenor saxophone
 Blue Mitchell, Tommy Turrentine – trumpet
 Julian Priester – trombone
 Jerry Dodgion – alto saxophone, flute
 Al Gibbons – bass clarinet, tenor saxophone
 Pepper Adams – baritone saxophone, clarinet
 McCoy Tyner – piano 
 Walter Booker – bass
 Mickey Roker – drums
 Duke Pearson – arranger

Production 
 Alfred Lion – producer
 Rudy Van Gelder – engineer

References 

2007 albums
Stanley Turrentine albums
Blue Note Records albums
Albums produced by Alfred Lion
Albums recorded at Van Gelder Studio
Albums arranged by Duke Pearson